Closteromorpha is a genus of moths of the family Noctuidae.

References

Hadeninae